Ernst Loof (4 July 1907 in Neindorf near Oschersleben – 3 March 1956 in Bonn) was an automotive engineer and racing driver from Germany. He contributed to the design of the BMW 328 sports car in the late 1930s.

Biography
Loof participated in one Formula One World Championship Grand Prix, the German Grand Prix held on 2 August 1953. He retired with fuel pump failure after two metres of racing and scored no championship points. Having only made it six feet off the starting grid, Loof holds the undesirable record for the driver with the shortest Formula One career, a record often falsely attributed to Marco Apicella.

Loof was also a famous motorcycle racer and designer, who scored numerous successes in pre-war years for Imperia of Bad Godesberg and for BMW. He later became one of the founders of the Veritas company, successful in Formula Two with the Meteor racer in the immediate post-war period. The company also built sports cars, mostly BMW-engined, as well as the Panhard-engined Dyna-Veritas cabriolets.

Loof was the head designer of the Veritas car he drove in this race. The company had already gone bankrupt by this time, and its assets were purchased by BMW. He was hired by BMW in styling and body engineering and worked there until he retired due to illness.

Loof died in 1956 of a brain tumour.

Complete World Championship results
(key)

Notes

References

Deaths from brain tumor
German racing drivers
German Formula One drivers
1907 births
1956 deaths

Formula One team owners
Formula One team principals
Racing drivers from Saxony-Anhalt